Tell It to the Volcano is the first album by the indie pop band Miniature Tigers, released on September 16, 2008.

Track listing
All songs written by Charlie Brand.
"Cannibal Queen" – 2:42
"Like or Like Like" – 2:37
"Dino Damage" – 2:22
"Tell It to the Volcano" – 2:33
"Hot Venom" – 2:49
"Tchaikovsky & Solitude" – 3:03
"The Wolf" – 2:34
"Giraffe" – 2:01
"Annie Oakley" – 3:09
"Haunted Pyramid" – 1:55
"Last Night's Fake Blood" – 3:33

References

2008 albums
Miniature Tigers albums